Wheelchair basketball at the 2010 Asian Para Games were held in Guangyao Gymnasium from 13 to 18 December. There were two gold medals in this sport.

Medalists

Men's tournament

Preliminary round

Group A

Group B

Final round

Semifinals

9-10th-place match

7-8th-place match

5-6th-place match

Bronze-medal match

Gold-medal match

Men's final standing

Women's tournament

References

Wheelchair basketball results

2010
2010 Asian Para Games events
2010–11 in Asian basketball
International basketball competitions hosted by China
2010–11 in Chinese basketball
2010 in wheelchair basketball